Yury Mihailovich Cheban (born on 27 January 1958) is a Transnistrian politician, who was the Minister of Natural Resources and Ecological Control of Transnistria. Yury Cheban was born in Hîncești and raised in Tiraspol, today the capital of Transnistria. Cheban was replaced by Oleg Alekseevich Kaliakin on 30 January 2007. Currently Yury Cheban is working as deputy chairman of the Council of Industrialists, Agrarians and Entrepreneurs of Pridnestrovie (SPAPP) - association of employers of Transnistria, uniting mostly representatives of large and medium business.

References

External links 
 Official website of the ministry (Russian)

Transnistrian politicians
Living people
1958 births